Montgomery, Maryland, may refer to:

 Montgomery Village, Maryland
 Montgomery County, Maryland